Serine protease inhibitor Kazal-type 2 also known as acrosin-trypsin inhibitor is a protein that in humans is encoded by the SPINK2 gene.

See also 
 Kazal-type serine protease inhibitor domain

References

Further reading